Shahranaz is a Syrian town located in the Qalaat al-Madiq Subdistrict of the al-Suqaylabiyah District in Hama Governorate. According to the Syria Central Bureau of Statistics (CBS), Shahranaz had a population of 1,646 in the 2004 census. Its inhabitants are predominantly Sunni Muslims.

References

Populated places in al-Suqaylabiyah District
Populated places in Jabal Zawiya